The Joy Luck Club may refer to:

 The Joy Luck Club (novel), a 1989 novel written by Amy Tan
 The Joy Luck Club (film), a 1993 film adaptation of the above novel
 The Joy Luck Club, a production by TheatreWorks in Silicon Valley, California